Bulletins of American Paleontology is a peer-reviewed scientific journal published by the Paleontological Research Institution and issued biannually that features monographs and dissertations in the field of paleontology and other related subjects. Founded by Gilbert Harris in 1895, it is the oldest continuously-published paleontological periodical in the Western Hemisphere, and one of the oldest in the world.

History
In 1895, Gilbert Harris, a professor of geology at Cornell University, established  Bulletins of American Paleontology in order to publish his research on Paleocene and Eocene mollusk fossils. Printing originally took place at Harris's own printing enterprise at McGraw Hall, Cornell. Publication of Bulletins was transferred to the Paleontological Research Institution upon its founding by Gilbert Harris in 1932.

In 1961, PRI signed an agreement with Kraus Reprints (now Periodicals Service Company) to reprint out-of-print issues of Bulletins.

Since 1986, Bulletins has featured the series "Neogene Paleontology of the Northern Dominican Republic", a large-scale project to identify and collect fossils from the Neogene Caribbean sequence. 20 systemic monographs in the series have been published in Bulletins of American Paleontology.

Abstracting and indexing 
The journal is abstracted and indexed in:

References

External links 
 

Paleontology journals
Publications established in 1895
Biannual journals
English-language journals